Patty Fendick and Patricia Hy defeated Carin Anderholm and Helena Olsson in the final, 6–1, 7–5 to win the girls' doubles tennis title at the 1983 Wimbledon Championships.

Seeds

  Beverly Bowes /  Terry Phelps (semifinals)
  Patty Fendick /  Patricia Hy (champions)
  Michelle Torres /  Marianne Werdel (first round)
  Nathalie Herreman /  Larisa Savchenko (semifinals)

Draw

Draw

References

External links

Girls' Doubles
Wimbledon Championship by year – Girls' doubles